"No More Lies" is the second single released from the Moody Blues 1988 album Sur la Mer.  As a single, it charted at #15 on the Adult Contemporary chart in 1988.  Like the album's previous single, "I Know You're Out There Somewhere," "No More Lies" was also written by Justin Hayward.  

Hayward sings the lead vocals and John Lodge provides counterpoint with his backing vocals. Music journalist Geoffrey Freakes described "No More Lies" as being a "breezy acoustic and electric guitar-driven tune" but said that "although mildly memorable, it's the kind of song you feel [Hayward] could dash off in his sleep."  Freakes described the drum and bass parts as sounding "synthetic" but the keyboards as "stirring".

Richmond Times-Dispatch critic John Wirt said that "No More Lies" "features the warm, sincere vocals of Justin Hayward."  Daily Press critic Joseph Pryweller felt that the song is marred by "syrupy, Mrs. Butterworth-type about lovers walking by the ocean." In his review of Sur la Mer,  Portage Daily Register critic Jim Roach felt the song was "hit record material", saying that "the smooth texture of full sounding acoustic guitars with impeccably played electrics provide the perfect setting for the romantic unhurried vocal." Sun record reviewers John McCurdy and Ron Judd felt it was an "average song" that the group turned into "pure magic with a stunning vocal performance."

Music video
A music video was created for "No More Lies", directed by Danny Kleinman and produced by Jane Reardon.  Although he did not play on the song (or on any song on Sur la Mer), Ray Thomas is seen "playing" tambourine on the music video, and is also shown on the picture sleeve of the single.  Billboard described the video as combining "live performance with cell animation and color Xerography."

Chart positions

Personnel
 Justin Hayward: acoustic and electric guitars, vocals
 John Lodge: bass guitar
 Patrick Moraz: keyboards
 Graeme Edge: drums, percussion

References

External links
"No More Lies" Music Video (YouTube)

1988 singles
The Moody Blues songs
Songs written by Justin Hayward
Song recordings produced by Tony Visconti
1988 songs
Polydor Records singles